Jean-Louis Livi (born 29 January 1941) is a French film producer.

Livi was nominated for an Academy Award and two BAFTA Film Awards for producing The Father (2020).

Early life 
Jean-Louis Livi is the son of Giuliano/Julien Livi (1917–1994), the older brother of Italian-French actor Yves Montand.

Career 
Between 1990 and 2006, Livi was director of the production companies Film par film and SEDIF (Société d'exploitation et de distribution de films) Productions. Since 2006, he has been the director the production company F comme film. Livi also manages the company Solivagus Productions.

Livi and Bernard Murat have been co-directors of the Théâtre des Mathurins and of the Théâtre Édouard VII in Paris.

In 2021, Livi became a member of the Academy of Motion Picture Arts and Sciences.

Selected filmography

Awards and nominations

Honours 
 9 July 2014:  Commandeur of the Ordre des Arts et des Lettres

References

External links 
 
 

1941 births
Living people
French film producers
People from Marseille
Commandeurs of the Ordre des Arts et des Lettres